The 1991–92 NBA season was the 46th season of the National Basketball Association in New York City. In the off-season, the Knicks hired Pat Riley to take over as head coach, while acquiring Xavier McDaniel from the Phoenix Suns, and signing free agent Anthony Mason. Riley, who previously coached the Los Angeles Lakers two years ago had an impact, as the Knicks held a 30–16 record at the All-Star break. At midseason, the team traded Brian Quinnett to the Dallas Mavericks in exchange for James Donaldson. The Knicks finished second in the Atlantic Division with a 51–31 record.

Patrick Ewing led the team with 24.0 points, 11.2 rebounds and 3.0 blocks per game, and was named to the All-NBA Second Team and NBA All-Defensive Second Team, was selected for the 1992 NBA All-Star Game, and finished in fifth place in Most Valuable Player voting. In addition, John Starks played an increased role as the team's sixth man, averaging 13.9 points per game off the bench, while McDaniel provided the team with 13.7 points and 5.6 rebounds per game, and Gerald Wilkins contributed 12.4 points per game. Mark Jackson provided with 11.3 points, 8.6 assists and 1.4 steals per game, while Mason also played a sixth man role, averaging 7.0 points and rebounds per game each, off the bench, and Charles Oakley contributed 6.2 points and 8.5 rebounds per game. Riley finished in second place in Coach of the Year voting.

In the Eastern Conference First Round of the playoffs, the Knicks eliminated the Detroit Pistons in five games. In the Eastern Conference Semi-finals, the Knicks faced off against the defending champion Chicago Bulls for the second straight year. The Knicks frustrated the Bulls and Michael Jordan with their physical play, winning Game 1 on the road, 94–89, and then winning Game 6 at home, 100–86 to tie the series at 3–3. However, the Knicks lost to the Bulls in seven games as the Bulls–Knicks rivalry was born. The Bulls would defeat the Portland Trail Blazers in six games in the NBA Finals, winning their second consecutive championship.

Following the season, McDaniel signed as a free agent with the Boston Celtics, while Jackson was traded to the Los Angeles Clippers, Kiki Vandeweghe signed as a free agent with the Clippers, Wilkins signed with the Cleveland Cavaliers, and Donaldson was released to free agency.

Draft picks

Roster

Regular season

Season standings

y – clinched division title
x – clinched playoff spot

z – clinched division title
y – clinched division title
x – clinched playoff spot

Record vs. opponents

Game log

Playoffs

|- align="center" bgcolor="#ccffcc"
| 1
| April 24
| Detroit
| W 109–75
| Patrick Ewing (24)
| Patrick Ewing (12)
| Mark Jackson (6)
| Madison Square Garden19,081
| 0–1
|- align="center" bgcolor="#ffcccc"
| 2
| April 26
| Detroit
| L 88–89
| Xavier McDaniel (24)
| Charles Oakley (18)
| Mark Jackson (10)
| Madison Square Garden18,793
| 1–1
|- align="center" bgcolor="#ccffcc"
| 3
| April 28
| @ Detroit
| W 90–87 (OT)
| Patrick Ewing (32)
| Ewing, McDaniel (13)
| Mark Jackson (7)
| The Palace of Auburn Hills21,454
| 1–2
|- align="center" bgcolor="#ffcccc"
| 4
| May 1
| @ Detroit
| L 82–86
| Ewing, McDaniel (18)
| Charles Oakley (16)
| Greg Anthony (6)
| The Palace of Auburn Hills21,454
| 2–2
|- align="center" bgcolor="#ccffcc"
| 5
| May 3
| Detroit
| W 94–87
| Patrick Ewing (31)
| Patrick Ewing (19)
| Mark Jackson (5)
| Madison Square Garden19,135
| 2–3
|-

|- align="center" bgcolor="#ccffcc"
| 1
| May 5
| @ Chicago
| W 94–89
| Patrick Ewing (34)
| Patrick Ewing (16)
| Patrick Ewing (5)
| Chicago Stadium18,676
| 1–0
|- align="center" bgcolor="#ffcccc"
| 2
| May 7
| @ Chicago
| L 78–86
| Patrick Ewing (16)
| Patrick Ewing (16)
| Wilkins, Anthony (4)
| Chicago Stadium18,676
| 1–1
|- align="center" bgcolor="#ffcccc"
| 3
| May 9
| Chicago
| L 86–94
| Patrick Ewing (27)
| Patrick Ewing (11)
| Mark Jackson (8)
| Madison Square Garden19,763
| 1–2
|- align="center" bgcolor="#ccffcc"
| 4
| May 10
| Chicago
| W 93–86
| Xavier McDaniel (24)
| Charles Oakley (12)
| John Starks (5)
| Madison Square Garden19,763
| 2–2
|- align="center" bgcolor="#ffcccc"
| 5
| May 12
| @ Chicago
| L 88–96
| Xavier McDaniel (26)
| Ewing, Oakley (7)
| Mark Jackson (12)
| Chicago Stadium18,676
| 2–3
|- align="center" bgcolor="#ccffcc"
| 6
| May 14
| Chicago
| W 100–86
| Patrick Ewing (27)
| Xavier McDaniel (11)
| Mark Jackson (15)
| Madison Square Garden19,763
| 3–3
|- align="center" bgcolor="#ffcccc"
| 7
| May 17
| @ Chicago
| L 81–100
| Patrick Ewing (22)
| Charles Oakley (10)
| Mark Jackson (11)
| Chicago Stadium18,676
| 3–4
|-

Player statistics

NOTE: Please write the players statistics in alphabetical order by last name.

Season

Playoffs

Awards and records 

 Patrick Ewing, All-NBA Second Team Selection
 Patrick Ewing, NBA All-Defensive Second Team Selection

Transactions

See also
1991–92 NBA season

References

 Knicks on Database Basketball

New York Knicks seasons
New York Knicks
New York Knicks
New York Knicks
1990s in Manhattan
Madison Square Garden